CD8a (Cluster of Differentiation 8a), is a human gene.

Function 

The CD8 antigen is a cell surface glycoprotein found on most cytotoxic T lymphocytes that mediates efficient cell-cell interactions within the immune system. The CD8 antigen, acting as a coreceptor, and the T-cell receptor on the T lymphocyte recognize antigen displayed by an antigen-presenting cell (APC) in the context of class I MHC molecules. The functional coreceptor is either a homodimer composed of two alpha chains, or a heterodimer composed of one alpha and one beta chain. Both alpha and beta chains share significant homology to immunoglobulin variable light chains. This gene encodes the CD8 alpha chain isoforms. Two alternative transcripts encoding distinct isoforms, one membrane associated and one secreted, have been identified.

Interactions 

CD8A has been shown to interact with:
 CD3D, 
 HLA-A, and
 HLA-G.

See also 
 Cluster of differentiation

References

Further reading

External links 
 
 
 
 
 

Clusters of differentiation